The Pocono Mountain Formation is a geologic formation in Virginia. It preserves fossils dating back to the Carboniferous period.

See also

 List of fossiliferous stratigraphic units in Virginia
 Paleontology in Virginia

References
 

Geologic formations of Virginia
Carboniferous southern paleotropical deposits